Puerto Rico Highway 6685 (PR-6685) is a rural highway in Puerto Rico that runs south to north, connecting the towns of Ciales and Manatí on Puerto Rico's north coast. It runs slightly parallel to Puerto Rico Highway 149 until it ends at Puerto Rico Highway 2 in Manatí. It has a junction with PR-149 in Ciales and with Puerto Rico Highway 642 in Río Arriba Saliente barrio, in Manatí.

Major intersections

See also

References

External links
 

6685